Nausicaa (or) also spelled Nausicaä or Nausikaa, is a character in Homer's Odyssey. She is the daughter of King Alcinous and Queen Arete of Phaeacia. Her name means "burner of ships" ( 'ship';  'to burn').

Role in the Odyssey

In Book Six of the Odyssey, Odysseus is shipwrecked on the coast of the island of Scheria (Phaeacia in some translations). Nausicaä and her handmaidens go to the seashore to wash clothes. Awakened by their games, Odysseus emerges from the forest completely naked, scaring the servants away, and begs Nausicaä for aid. She gives Odysseus some of the laundry to wear and takes him to the edge of the town. Realizing that rumors might arise if Odysseus is seen with her, she and the servants go into town ahead of him, but first she advises him to go directly to Alcinous's house and make his case to Nausicaä's mother, Arete. Arete is known as wiser even than Alcinous, and Alcinous trusts her judgment. Odysseus follows this advice, approaching Arete and winning her approval, and is received as a guest by Alcinous.

During his stay, Odysseus recounts his adventures to Alcinous and his court. This recounting forms a substantial portion of the Odyssey. Alcinous then generously provides Odysseus with the ships that finally bring him home to Ithaca.

Nausicaä is young and very pretty; Odysseus says she resembles a goddess, particularly Artemis.  Nausicaä is known to have several brothers. According to Aristotle and Dictys of Crete, she later married Odysseus's son Telemachus, and had a son, Poliporthes.

Homer gives a literary account of love never expressed (possibly one of the earliest examples of unrequited love in literature). Nausicaä is presented as a potential love interest for Odysseus: she tells her friend that she would like her husband to be like him, and her father tells Odysseus that he would let him marry her. The two do not have a romantic relationship, however, and she marries Telemachus in some versions. Nausicaä is also a mother figure for Odysseus; she ensures his return home, and says "Never forget me, for I gave you life". Odysseus never tells Penelope about his encounter with Nausicaä, out of all the women he met on his long journey home. Some suggest this indicates a deeper level of feeling for the young woman.

Gallery

References

Sources
 Portions of this material originated as excerpts from the public-domain 1848 edition of the Classical Dictionary by John Lemprière.

External links 
 

Princesses in Greek mythology
Characters in the Odyssey
Phaeacians in Greek mythology